Dracopristis is an extinct genus of ctenacanth (a group of shark-like elasmobranchs) that lived around 307 million years ago, during the Pennsylvanian sub-period of the Carboniferous period. The fish had 12 rows of short, squat teeth, and an array of spines on its dorsal fins. The main differentiation between ctenacanthiformes and true sharks is that ctenacanthiform mouths are larger but less flexible than the true sharks. The spines of the holotype fossil are about 0.57 meters long, and the whole body was around 2 meters (6 ft) long.

Discovery and description

Fossils of D. hoffmanorum were first discovered in 2013, when a graduate student unearthed the fish's remains from late Pennsylvanian age rocks of Albuquerque, New Mexico. The creature was formally named seven years later in a 2021 paper which described, named and classified it. The fish's fossils were found within the Tinajas member, which dates to the late Pennsylvanian. The holotype specimen, named NMMNH P-68537, is an articulated skeleton that belonged to an adult female at death. The holotype specimen was very complete, with about 87-90% preserved. The holotype fossil represents the most complete one known from a ctenacanthiform. The fish's genus name means "dragon shark" in Latin, and the species name is in honor of Ralph and Jeanette Hoffman who helped conduct the research. A second fossil, NMMNH P-19181, is known. This second fossil consists of a neurocranium from a juvenile individual, and was originally described as a specimen of Orthacanthus huberi. The teeth of this fish were similar to other ctenacanthiforms, with multi-cusped prongs which would have allowed the creature to grip on and crush prey. A notable difference between ctenacanthiforms and true sharks is that the former possessed large dorsal fin spines, which were probably used as a defense against predators. This can be presumed based on a fossil of the placoderm Holdenius being found with the spine of a ctenacanthiform lodged in its head. The fin spines of Dracopristis were very large, at about 57 centimeters long (about 27% of the total body length).

Classification

This fish was part of an order of Chondrichthyes known as the Ctenacathiformes. These fish were part of the subclass Elasmobranchii, and the infraclass Euselachii, meaning they were closely related to sharks. However, because they were not part of the clade Selachimorpha, they were not true sharks. In the holotype study conducted in 2021, multiple cladistic studies were performed, and they found that this fish formed a sister taxa with Ctenacanthus, and Bandringa was recovered within the Euselachii alongside Tristychius, and Sphenacanthus. They also suggested that ctenacanthiforms and xenacanthids are closer to the crown group euselachians than other chondricthyes like the Symmoriiformes.

Paleoecology  and paleobiology
When Dracopristis was alive New Mexico was covered under a vast seaway; it would have lived in shallow coastal waters, and probably would have been an ambush predator, hunting small fish, crustaceans, and smaller chondrichthyes. Its teeth suggest that it was adapted towards grasping and crushing prey. The shape of the fins suggests it lurked at the bottom, and used its fin spines to protect itself from predators. The fossils were in the Atrasado Formation, more specifically within the Kinney Brick Quarry. During the Carboniferous this spot on earth was a diverse area that consisted of estuary and lagoon areas. There might have been an anoxic bottom, allowing fossils to be preserved without scavengers disturbing them. Based on some of the fish specimens, some of them may have adapted to freshwater environments, and because of the environment, fish of both fresh and saltwater would have come into contact with one another. In fact, this fish is only known from fossils found within the quarry. It also lived alongside the larger ctenacanth, Glikmanius occidentalis, and may have been a potential prey to the larger fish. The site has also preserved the remains of "two hybodontiforms, two holocephalans, three actinopterygians, and a megalichthyoform sarcopterygian", as well as more than 31 distinct fish genera. Other fish, such as the large eugeneodont Campyloprion might have been occasional marine visitors.

References

Prehistoric cartilaginous fish genera
Fossil taxa described in 2021
Fish described in 2021
Sharks